Shinbone Alley (sometimes performed as archy & mehitabel) is a musical with a book by Joe Darion and Mel Brooks, lyrics by Darion, and music by George Kleinsinger. Based on the album Archy and Mehitabel: A Back-Alley Opera, which in turned was based on archy and mehitabel,  a series of New York Tribune columns by Don Marquis (illustrated by Krazy Kat author George Herriman), it focuses on poetic cockroach archy (who wasn't strong enough to depress the typewriter's shift-key), alley cat mehitabel, and her relationships with theatrical cat tyrone t. tattersal and tomcat big bill, under the watchful eye of the newspaperman, the voice-over narrator and only human being in the show.

Productions and background
The project began in 1954 as a Columbia Records concept album with Marquis' original title, featuring Eddie Bracken, Carol Channing, and David Wayne. That same year a concert version was presented by the Little Orchestra Society at The Town Hall in New York City. With an expanded book, the addition of several lengthy ballet sequences, and a cast of animal characters, the rechristened Shinbone Alley preceded Cats by a couple of decades and was a precursor of the far more successful Andrew Lloyd Webber hit. It was one of the first Broadway shows to feature a fully integrated cast.

The original Shinbone Alley was in Manhattan.

With neither an out-of-town tryout nor a preview period, the Broadway production opened on April 13, 1957, at The Broadway Theatre, and closed on May 25, 1957, after 49 performances. Following "creative differences" with the writers and producers, original director Norman Lloyd requested that his name be removed from the credits. The production was supervised by Sawyer Falk and choreographed by Joe and Rod Alexander, with production design by Eldon Elder, costumes by Motley, and  lighting by Tharon Musser. The cast featured Bracken, reprising his role as archy, Eartha Kitt as mehitabel, Erik Rhodes as tyrone, and George S. Irving as big bill. Supporting players included Cathryn Damon, Jacques d'Amboise, Ross Martin, Lillian Hayman, and Allegra Kent. Relative newcomer Chita Rivera was Kitt's standby.

The show's sole Tony Award nomination was for Best Costume Design. In lieu of a cast album recorded in a studio, a tape of a live performance was transferred to acetate and released on the Legend label. In 2005 the musical had its Australian premiere in Melbourne, under the name archy & mehitabel. Produced by Magnormos, it was directed by Aaron Joyner and starred Jane Badler in the role of mehitabel, and Michael Lindner as archy. The "Musicals Tonight!" series presented a staged concert version in November 2006 in New York City.

Current licensing
Licensing and performance rights are being held by Music Theatre International, under the archy & mehitabel title.

Film and TV adaptations
On May 16, 1960, an abridged version of the musical was broadcast under the original title archy & mehitabel as part of the syndicated TV anthology series Play of the Week presented by David Susskind. The cast included Bracken, Tammy Grimes, and Jules Munshin. 

Bracken and Channing reunited to provide the voices for the Allied Artists animated feature film in 1971, Shinbone Alley, directed by John David Wilson for Fine Arts Films.

Songs

Act I
 What Do We Care?
 Toujours Gai
 Queer Little Insect
 Big Bill
 True Romance
 The Lightning Bug Song
 I Gotta Be
 Dog And Cat Ballet
 Flotsam and Jetsam
 Come to Mee-ow
 Suicide Song
 Shinbone Alley

Act II
 The Moth Song
 Vacant Lot Ballet
 A Woman Wouldn't Be A Woman
 The Lullaby
 Mehitabel's A House Cat
 Pretty Kitty
 Be a Pussycat
 The Lady Bug Song
 Flotsam and Jetsam (Reprise)
 Shinbone Alley Finale

Notes

References
 Mandelbaum, Ken. Not Since Carrie: Forty Years of Broadway Musical Flops. St. Martin's Press (1991), pp. 301–303

External links

 
 
 
 

1957 musicals
Broadway musicals
Musicals by Mel Brooks
Adaptations of works by Don Marquis